The Instituto Nacional de Estudos e Pesquisas Educacionais Anísio Teixeira (INEP) is an agency connected to the Brazilian Ministry of Education in charge of evaluating educational systems and the quality of education in Brazil.

See also
 Universities and higher education in Brazil
 CNPq
 Lattes Platform
 Brazilian science and technology
 Ministry of Education (Brazil)
 Coordenadoria de Aperfeiçoamento de Pessoal de Nível Superior (CAPES)
 Undergraduate education in Brazil
 Graduate degrees in Brazil
 Bachelor's degree in Brazil

Higher education in Brazil